Arun Chaprana (born 5 January 1994) is an Indian cricketer. He made his List A debut for Haryana in the 2018–19 Vijay Hazare Trophy on 21 September 2018. He made his Twenty20 debut for Haryana in the 2018–19 Syed Mushtaq Ali Trophy on 21 February 2019.

References

External links
 

1994 births
Living people
Indian cricketers
Haryana cricketers
Place of birth missing (living people)